Nursing assessment is the gathering of information about a patient's physiological, psychological, sociological, and spiritual status by a licensed Registered Nurse. Nursing assessment is the first step in the nursing process. A section of the nursing assessment may be delegated to certified nurses aides. Vitals and EKG's may be delegated to certified nurses aides or nursing techs. (Nurse Journal, 2017) It differs from a medical diagnosis. In some instances, the nursing assessment is very broad in scope and in other cases it may focus on one body system or mental health. Nursing assessment is used to identify current and future patient care needs. It incorporates the recognition of normal versus abnormal body physiology. Prompt recognition of pertinent changes along with the skill of critical thinking allows the nurse to identify and prioritize appropriate interventions. An assessment format may already be in place to be used at specific facilities and in specific circumstances.

The client interview

Before assessment can begin the nurse must establish a professional and therapeutic mode of communication. This develops rapport and lays the foundation of a trusting, non-judgmental relationship. This will also assure that the person will be as comfortable as possible when revealing personal information. A common method of initiating therapeutic communication by the nurse is to have the nurse introduce herself or himself. The interview proceeds to asking the client how they wish to be addressed and the general nature of the topics that will be included in the interview.

The therapeutic communication methods of nursing assessment takes into account developmental stage (toddler vs. the elderly), privacy, distractions, age-related impediments to communication such as sensory deficits and language, place, time, non-verbal cues. Therapeutic communication is also facilitated by avoiding the use of  medical jargon and instead using common terms used by the patient.

During the first part of the personal interview, the nurse carries out an analysis of the patient needs. In many cases, the client requires a focused assessment rather than a comprehensive nursing assessment of the entire bodily systems. In the focused assessment, the major complaint is assessed. The nurse may employ the use of acronyms performing the assessment: 
OLDCART
Onset of health concern or complaint
Location of pain or other symptoms related to the area of the body involved
Duration of health concern or complaint
Characteristics
Aggravating factors or what makes the concern or complaint worse
Relieving factors or what makes the concern or complaint better
Treatments or what treatments were tried in the past or ongoing

Patient history and interview

The patient history and interview is considered to be subjective but still of high importance when combined with objective measurements. High quality interviewing strategies include the use of open-ended questions. Open-ended questions are those that cannot be answered with a simple "yes" or "no" response. If the person is unable to respond, then family or caregivers will be given the opportunity to answer the questions.

The typical nursing assessment in the clinical setting will be the collection of data about the following:

present complaint and nature of symptoms
onset of symptoms
severity of symptoms
classifying symptoms as acute or chronic
health history

family history 
social history 
current medical and/or nursing management 
understanding of medical and nursing plans 
perception of illness

In addition, the nursing assessment may include reviewing the results of laboratory values such as blood work and urine analysis. Medical records of the client assist to determine the baseline measures related to their health.

In some instances, the nursing assessment will not incorporate the typical patient history and interview if prioritization indicates that immediate action is urgent to preserve the airway, breathing and circulation. This is also known as triage and is used in emergency rooms and medical team disaster response situations. The patient history is documented through a personal interview with the client and/or the client's family. If there is an urgent need for a focused assessment, the most obvious or troubling complaint will be addressed first. This is especially important in the case of extreme pain.

Physical examination

A nursing assessment includes a physical examination:  the observation or measurement of signs, which can be observed or measured, or symptoms such as nausea or vertigo, which can be felt by the patient.

The techniques used may include inspection, palpation, auscultation and percussion in addition to the "vital signs" of temperature, blood pressure, pulse and respiratory rate, and further examination of the body systems such as the cardiovascular or musculoskeletal systems.

Focused assessment

Neurovascular assessment
The nurse conducts a neurovascular assessment to determine sensory and muscular function of the arms and legs in addition to peripheral circulation. The focused neurovascular assessment includes the objective observation of pulses, capillary refill, skin color and temperature, and sensation. During the neurovascular assessment the measures between extremities are compared. A neurovascular assessment is an evaluation of the extremities along with sensory, circulation and motor function.

Mental status
During the assessment, interactions and functioning are evaluated and documented. Those specific items assessed include:
orientation, memory,
mood, depression, anxiety, coherence, hallucinations, illusions, insight
speech patterns (rate, clarity clanging)
grooming, personal hygiene,  appropriateness of clothing
response to verbal and tactile stimuli, level of consciousness,  and alertness
posture, gait, appropriateness of movements

Pain

Pain is no longer being identified as the fifth vital sign due to the prevalence of opioid abuse and over-prescribing of narcotic pain relievers.  However, assessment for pain is still very important. Assessment of a patient's experience of pain is a crucial component in providing effective pain management. Pain is not a simple sensation that can be easily assessed and measured. Nurses should be aware of the many factors that can influence the patient's overall experience and expression of pain, and these should be considered during the assessment process. Systematic process of pain assessment, measurement, and re-assessment (re-evaluation), enhances the healthcare teams' ability to achieve. Pain is assessed for its provocative and palliative associations; quality, region/radiation, severity (numerical scale or pictorial, Wong-Baker Faces scale); and time—of onset, duration, frequency, and length of provocative and relief measures.

Integument

hair: quantity, location, distribution, texture
nails: shape and color, presence of clubbing
lesions: type, location, arrangement, color of lesions, drainage, depth, width, length
texture, moisture, color,  elasticity, turgor

Head

scalp, facial symmetry, sensation
eyes
acuity
eyelids
lacrimal glands
conjunctiva
visual fields
peripheral vision
sclera
size, shape, symmetry, pupil reactions
movement (cranial nerves)
 ears
external structure
inner ear
eardrum
hearing (frequencies of sound detected)
dentation

Psychosocial assessment

The main areas considered in a psychological examination are intellectual health and emotional health. Assessment of cognitive function, checking for hallucinations and delusions, measuring concentration levels, and inquiring into the client's hobbies and interests constitute an intellectual health assessment. Emotional health is assessed by observing and inquiring about how the client feels and what he does in response to these feelings. The psychological examination may also include the client's perceptions (why they think they are being assessed or have been referred, what they hope to gain from the meeting). Religion and beliefs are also important areas to consider. The need for a physical health assessment is always included in any psychological examination to rule out structural damage or anomalies.

Safety
environment
ambulatory aids

Cultural assessment
The nursing cultural assessment will identify factors that may impede or facilitate the implementation of a nursing diagnosis. Cultural factors have a major impact on the nursing assessment. Some of the information obtained during the interview include:
ethnic origin
primary language
second language
the need for an interpreter
the client's main support system(s)
family living arrangements
Who is the major decision maker in the family? What are the family members' roles within the family
Describe religious beliefs and practices
Are there any religious requirements/restrictions that place limitations on the client's care? 
Who in the family takes responsibility for health concerns? 
Describe any special health beliefs and practices: 
From whom does family usually seek medical assistance in time of need? 
Describe client's usual emotional/behavioral response to: Anxiety: Anger: Loss/change/failure: Pain: Fear: 
Describe any topics that are particularly sensitive or that the client is unwilling to discuss (because of cultural taboos): 
Describe any activities in which the client is unwilling to participate (because of cultural customs or taboos): 
What are the client's personal feelings regarding touch? 
What are the client's personal feelings regarding eye contact? 
What is the client's personal orientation to time? (past, present, future) 
Describe any particular illnesses to which the client may be bioculturally susceptible (e.g., hypertension and sickle cell anemia in *African Americans): 
Describe any nutritional deficiencies to which the client may be bioculturally susceptible (e.g., lactose intolerance in Native and Asian Americans) 
Are there any foods the client requests or refuses because of cultural beliefs related to this illness (e.g., "hot" and "cold" foods for Latino Americans and Asian Americans)?

Assessment tools

A range of instruments and tools have been developed to assist nurses in their assessment role. These include: the index of independence in activities of daily living, the Barthel index, the Crighton Royal behaviour rating scale, the Clifton assessment procedures for the elderly, the general health questionnaire, and the geriatric mental health state schedule.

Other assessment tools may focus on a specific aspect of the patient's care. For example, the Waterlow score and the Braden scale deals with a patient's risk of developing a Pressure ulcer (decubitus ulcer), the Glasgow Coma Scale measures the conscious state of a person, and various pain scales exist to assess the "fifth vital sign".

The use of medical equipment is routinely employed to conduct a nursing assessment. These include, the otoscope, thermometer, stethoscope, penlight, sphygmomanometer, bladder scanner, speculum, and eye charts. Besides the interviewing process, the nursing assessment utilizes certain techniques to collect information such as observation, auscultation, palpation and percussion.

See also

 Assessment (disambiguation)
 Nursing diagnosis

References

Bibliography
Ackley, Betty (2010). Nursing diagnosis handbook : an evidence-based guide to planning care. Maryland Heights, Mo: Mosby. .
 Amico, Donita (2016). Health & physical assessment in nursing. Boston: Pearson. .
 Bates, Barbara (1995). A pocket guide to physical examination and history taking. Philadelphia: Lippincott. .
Habich, Michele, and MariJo Letizia. 2015. "Pediatric Pain Assessment In the Emergency Department: A Nursing Evidence-Based Practice Protocol." Pediatric Nursing 41, no. 4: 198–202.
 Henry, Norma Jean, Mendy McMichael, Janean Johnson, Agnes DiStasi, Brenda S. Ball, Honey C. Holman, Mary Jane Janowski, Marsha S. Barlow, Peggy Leehy and Terri Lemon (2016). Fundamentals for Nursing, Review Module Edition 9.0. Assessment Technologies Institute. .
 Kozier, Barbara (2012). Kozier & Erb's fundamentals of nursing : concepts, process, and practice. Boston: Pearson. .
 Longe, Jacqueline (2006). The Gale encyclopedia of nursing & allied health. Detroit: Thomson Gale. .
 Potter, Patricia (2013). Fundamentals of nursing. St. Louis, Mo: Mosby Elsevier. .* Smith, Sandra (2008). Clinical nursing skills : basic to advanced skills. Upper Saddle River, N.J: Pearson Prentice Hall. . 
 Smith, Sandra (2002). Photo guide of nursing skills. Upper Saddle River, N.J: Prentice Hall. .
 Taylor, Carol (2015). Fundamentals of nursing : the art and science of person-centered nursing care. Philadelphia: Wolters Kluwer Health. 
 Townsend, Mary (2015). Psychiatric nursing : assessment, care plans, and medications. Philadelphia: F.A. Davis Company. .
 Weber, Janet (2014). Nurses' handbook of health assessment. Philadelphia: Wolters Kluwer/Lippincott Williams & Wilkins Health. .

Journals
 Schreiber, Mary L. Evidence-Based Practice. Neurovascular Assessment: An Essential Nursing Focus. MEDSURG Nursing (MEDSURG NURS), Jan/Feb2016; 25(1): 55–57.

Further reading
 Harkreader, Helen and Mary Ann Hogan. Fundamentals of Nursing: Caring and Clinical Judgement. (2003) W B Saunders Co. 

==External links==
 Glasgow coma scale
 Morse Fall Assessment An assessment tool to determine and quantify persons as low, mid, and high risk for falls.
 Pressure Ulcer Staging Guide, from the Wound Care Institute
 National Pressure Ulcer Advisory Panel 
 Audio recordings of Korotkoff sounds. CETL, Clinical and Communication Skills, Barts and City University of London.
Assessing Body Temperature. CETL, Clinical and Communication. Barts and City University of London.
Assessing The Abdomen. CETL, Clinical and Communication. Barts and City University of London.
Physical assessment. ATI Nursing Education.

Assessment, Nursing
Physical examination